Leeds Carnegie was a brand name used by several sports teams associated with the Carnegie School of Physical Education, now part of Leeds Beckett University. These include:

Current
 Leeds Carnegie Handball Club

Changed name
 Leeds Carnegie (basketball), now Leeds Force
 Leeds Carnegie (women's basketball), now Leeds Force (women)
 Leeds Carnegie (rugby union), now Leeds Tykes
 Leeds Carnegie L.F.C., now Leeds United Women F.C.

Defunct
 Leeds Carnegie F.C.
 Leeds Carnegie (netball), later Yorkshire Jets

 
Leeds Beckett University
Sport in Leeds